Twin Peaks has had various VHS and DVD releases over the years, with varying degrees of commercial and critical success.  Home video releases of Twin Peaks have had problems with rights management, most notably with the delayed DVD release of Season 2.

International pilot
The pilot episode, first shown on TV in the US, was released on home video in Europe in 1989. The international version are 20 minutes longer than the TV pilot, with a different ending added to bring closure to the story. Cooper, Truman, Hawk, and Andy find Bob, who admits to Laura's murder, and then is shot by Mike, the one-armed man. The Red Room dream sequence that ends episode two, where Cooper encounters the Man from Another Place and Laura Palmer, was originally shot for this film. Lynch was so happy with the material that he incorporated part of it into the second episode of the regular series (that is, the third episode shown in the U.S., including the pilot) as a dream Cooper has about the case (at the start of episode three, Cooper gives a scene-by-scene account of the European ending, including references to events seen only in the international pilot and not the dream-sequence version, such as Mike shooting Bob). This version of the pilot was also offered by Warner Home Video in the United States, resulting in a rights-entanglement which prevented the broadcast version of the pilot being released for a number of years. On October 30, 2007, the broadcast version of the pilot finally received a legitimate U.S. release as part of the Twin Peaks "Definitive Gold Box Edition". This set includes both versions of the pilot.

VHS and laserdisc
Japan, where Twin Peaks: Fire Walk with Me was first released, was the market for a complete set of 14 VHS cassettes of the series, distributed by Amuse Video and selling for the equivalent of US $440, by August 1992, about 15,000 sets had been sold, plus 7,000 sets of equally expensive laserdiscs.  This was in spite of the fact that the series had been carried only on Wowow, a pay television satellite channel that at the time had about 900,000 subscribers.

Home video releases and problems
On December 18, 2001, the first season (episodes 1-7, minus the pilot) of Twin Peaks was released on DVD in Region 1 by Republic Pictures, which had an output deal through Artisan Entertainment, now part of Lions Gate Entertainment. The box set was noted for being the first TV show to have its audio track redone in DTS. The region 1 release was heavily criticized for not including the key pilot episode, which could not be included due to the fact Lynch sold the rights to it to Warner Home Video in order to facilitate its video release in Europe. When the series was released on video in the US (twice by Spelling Entertainment's Worldvision Home Video), the pilot episode was excluded both times. In turn, Warner Home Video released the pilot on video — however, it was actually the international version, and was labelled as having "bonus footage". The televised pilot episode up to that time had been included in the UK (region 2) DVD release from Universal Home Entertainment. A DVD collection of Season One was released in Australia by Paramount Pictures, in 2001. In 2006, Season 2 was released by the same distributor in two parts (Collections 1 and 2). In addition, the entire series was released in Australia in a box set collector's edition.

The first season DVD box set is known to have production errors, which cause many DVD players to freeze. One known track glitch occurs during the opening credits of episode 2. Another glitch occurs fifteen minutes into episode 4, during Donna and Audrey's scene in the girls' high school restroom. The European DVD box set of season two has an audio flaw where in episode 12, the center and right channels have been flip-flopped. The release of Season Two was complicated by the sale of Spelling Entertainment (which included both Republic Pictures, and the predecessor company, Worldvision Enterprises, the series' former distributor) - and later the transition of video rights - to Paramount/Viacom in 1998; and the 2006 split of Viacom into two separate companies — this saw the rights go to CBS Corporation/CBS Studios. Also, Lynch oversaw the transfer from video to DVD personally, but was delayed by the production of his new film, Inland Empire.

The first season was released on DVD by Artisan Entertainment, the video licensee for Republic, but Artisan/Lions Gate's rights expired in September 2005, and thus were transferred to Paramount. As a result of the 2006 corporate split of CBS and Viacom, CBS Studios (which ended up with Republic Pictures' and Spelling Entertainment's TV holdings) now owns the rights to the original Twin Peaks series, with CBS Television Distribution handling syndication, and CBS Home Entertainment owning the DVD (and later Blu Ray) rights (although CBSHE releases are distributed by Paramount). The second season release was postponed several times, from September 2004, to early 2005, and then to September 2005, to early 2006. Season Two was finally released in the United States and Canada on April 3, 2007 via Paramount Home Entertainment/CBS DVD, which now acts as home video distributor. In Germany, Season 2 was released in two parts on separate dates in April 2007. Part 1 went on general release on January 4, 2007, including the "broadcast" version of the pilot episode. North American rights to the Twin Peaks: Fire Walk with Me film are owned by Janus Films, and is available on blu ray via The Criterion Collection as a stand-alone release, and as part of CBS’ various box sets of the franchise. In Canada, the DVD was distributed through Alliance Atlantis, which holds all Canadian rights to the New Line library.

The sequel series (...The Return, aka Season 3) was both a production of, and owned by, CBS subsidiary Showtime, and has been released on home video in-house (via Paramount).

At the 2007 San Diego Comic-Con, a Twin Peaks box set was confirmed for U.S. release. It includes both seasons, the two versions of the Pilot episode, deleted scenes for both seasons, and a feature-length retrospective documentary. It was released on October 30, 2007. No date as yet has been announced for a UK release. A Netherlands release exists which is Region 2 encoded, however the text on the packaging is in Dutch.

The Definitive Gold Box Set was released in Australia on December 4, 2007. Playback, the company that released Season 1 of Twin Peaks in the UK, announced that Season 2 would be available on Region 2 in the UK at the beginning of 2010. On March 22, 2010, both the second season DVD and the Definitive Gold Box Edition DVD were released in the UK.. On March 14, 2017 the Definitive Gold Box Set was re-released.

The Twin Peaks: The Entire Mystery Blu-ray boxed set was released on July 29, 2014. The set included 90 minutes of missing footage from Twin Peaks: Fire Walk With Me, as well as the entire film for the first time in a unified boxed set.

DVD release summary

References

Home video releases
Twin Peaks